, styled as OMRON, is a Japanese electronics company based in Kyoto, Japan.

The company originated in an area of Kyoto called ""(ja), from which the name "Omron" was derived. Prior to 1990, the corporation was known as Omron Tateishi Electronics. During the 1980s and early 1990s, the company motto was: "To the machine the work of machines, to man the thrill of further creation".

Omron's primary business is the manufacture and sale of automation components, equipment and systems. In the consumer and medical markets, it is known for medical equipment such as digital thermometers, blood pressure monitors and nebulizers. Omron developed the world's first electronic ticket gate, which was named an IEEE Milestone in 2007, and was one of the first manufacturers of automated teller machines (ATM) with magnetic stripe card readers.

Omron Oilfield & Marine is a provider of AC and DC drive systems and custom control systems for oil and gas and related industries.

Omron was named one of Thomson Reuters Top 100 Global Innovators in 2013.

Business divisions  and products
 Industrial automation: industrial robots, sensors, switches, industrial cameras, safety components, relays, control components, electric power monitoring equipment, power supplies and PLCs
 Electronic components: relays, switches, connectors, micro sensing devices, MEMS sensors, image sensing technologies, 
 Social systems: access control systems (building entry systems), road management systems, traffic signal controllers, security/surveillance cameras, automated ticket gates, ticket vending machines, fare adjustment machines
 Healthcare:
 Personal use: blood pressure monitors, digital thermometers, body composition monitors, pedometers, nebulizers
 Professional use: blood pressure monitors, non-invasive vascular monitors, portable ECGs, patient monitors
 Other businesses
 Power distribution and controls for drilling rigs
 Environmental sensors
 Electronic controls and automation for detention center systems

Shareholders
As of September 30, 2015:
 State Street Bank and Trust Company, 505223
 Japan Trustee Services Bank, Ltd.(trust account) 
 The Bank of Tokyo-Mitsubishi UFJ, Ltd. (trust account) 
 State Street Bank and Trust Company, 505001
 The Bank of Kyoto, Ltd.
 The Master Trust Bank of Japan, Ltd. (trust account)
 Nippon Life Insurance Company
 Japan Trustee Services Bank, Ltd. (trust account 9)
 The Bank of New York, Non-Treaty Jasdec Account

Gallery

See also

 Motorola 88000 used by the Omron luna88k 4-processor computer
 Arena, a browser which was extended by OMRON
 Yaskawa Electric Corporation
 EURion constellation
 Fuzzy logic
 MEMS

References

External links 
 

Medical technology companies of Japan
Electronics companies of Japan
Access control
Robotics companies of Japan
Industrial automation
Defense companies of Japan
Manufacturing companies based in Kyoto
Companies listed on the Tokyo Stock Exchange
Companies listed on the Frankfurt Stock Exchange
Electronics companies established in 1933
Japanese companies established in 1933
Japanese brands
Power supply manufacturers